Parviz Poorhosseini ( 11 September 1941 – 27 November 2020) was an Iranian film, theater and television actor.

Biography
He was best known for his roles in Bashu, the Little Stranger (1989), The Fifth Season (1997) and Saint Mary (1997). Other well-known films he had performed in include The Man Who Became a Mouse (1985), The Night it Happened (1988), Angel Day (1993), and Leila's Sleep (2007). He graduated with a bachelor's degree in performance arts from Tehran University's Faculty of Fine Arts. In 1961, with director Hamid Samandarian, he and other artists formed an acting troupe named Pasargad. Since then, Poorhosseini had appeared in more than 35 movies, over 70 TV shows and 60 theater performances.

He died of COVID-19 at Firoozgar Hospital in Tehran, aged 79.

Filmography

References

External links

1941 births
2020 deaths
People from Tehran
Iranian male actors
Male actors from Tehran
Iranian male film actors
Iranian male stage actors
Iranian male television actors
Deaths from the COVID-19 pandemic in Iran
Burials at artist's block of Behesht-e Zahra